The Bottoms is a Site of Special Scientific Interest in County Durham, England. It lies just south of the A181 road, roughly midway between the villages of Cassop and Wheatley Hill, some  10 km south-east of Durham city.

The site's interest lies in an area of unimproved magnesian limestone grassland, in which blue moor-grass, Sesleria albicans, and small scabious, Scabiosa columbaria, are the dominant species. This is a scarce vegetation type, which is found only in County Durham and the extent of which has been severely reduced by quarrying and intensive agriculture.

Other grasses that are frequent in the sward include meadow oat-grass, Avenula pratensis, quaking grass, Briza media, sheep's fescue, Festuca ovina, and crested hairgrass, Koeleria macrantha. There is a rich variety of herbs, including rock-rose, Helianthemum nummularium, glaucous sedge, Carex flacca, spring sedge, C. caryophyllea, and mouse-ear hawkweed, Pilosella officinarum, and a small population of purple milk-vetch, Astragalus danicus, a local rarity on magnesian limestone.

References

External links
 
 
 
 
 
 

Sites of Special Scientific Interest in County Durham